"The Key" is the debut solo single from Matt Goss. It was released in 1995 as the lead single from his debut solo album The Key. It peaked at number 40 on the UK Singles Chart and 35 in Belgium. The track was re-recorded and re-released in 2004 as "Minimal Chic Ft. Matt Goss" and peaked at number 54 on the UK Singles Chart.

Goss composed the music, lyrics, production, programming, keyboards, bass, vocals and backing vocals on the track with Tony Phillips on the production and mixing. The track was released in the UK, Italy, France, Netherlands and Australia. "Second Time Dreaming" was an exclusive B-side to the cassette single only in the UK.

The track was remixed by Italian DJ Joe T Vannelli and the remix peaked at number one in the Italian dance chart.

Track listings
 CD
 "The Key" (7" Edit) — 3:59
 "The Key" (Joe T Vannelli Dubby Mix) — 7:07
 "The Key" (Joe T Vannelli Corvette Mix) — 7:00
 "The Key" (Joe T Vannelli Corvette 2 Mix) — 7:35

 12"
 "The Key" (Joe T. Vannelli Dubby Mix) — 9:09
 "The Key" (Joe T. Vannelli Corvette 2 Mix) — 7:35

 Cassette single
 "The Key" (7" Edit) — 3:59
 "Second Time Dreaming" — 5:25

Personnel
 Guitar – Tim Pierce
 Keyboards – Max Cassan (CD tracks: 2, 3, 4)
 Music By, Lyrics By, Producer, Programmed By, Keyboards, Bass, Vocals, Backing Vocals – Matt Goss
 Producer, Recorded By, Mixed By, Programmed By – Tony Phillips
 Remix, Bass, Drums – Joe T. Vannelli (CD tracks: 2, 3, 4)

Charts

References 

1995 singles
Matt Goss songs